A. J. Fike (born December 29, 1980) is an American professional racing driver. He is the older brother of NASCAR driver Aaron Fike. Fike won the 1999 United States Auto Club (USAC) Midget Car rookie of the year title and his younger brother Aaron Fike won the award the following season making them the first brothers to win the award in back to back seasons. He later drove in several NASCAR races.

Racing career

ARCA
In Chevrolets and Pontiacs fielded by former ARCA RE/MAX Series driving champion Andy Hillenburg, he finished 7th in ARCA RE/MAX Series points in his first season on tour. In 50 career ARCA Series starts, he has 8 top-5 finishes and 19 top-10s with a career-best finish of second at Berlin Raceway in 2004. He scored his first career win in the ARCA series in 2015 when he led the most laps and won on a green-white-checkered finish at the Illinois State Fairgrounds in Springfield. Fike competed 15 of 20 ARCA Series events in 2016; he finished 9th in points with eight Top 10 and three Top 5 finishes.

Open-wheel
He finished tenth in the Indianapolis Speedrome midget points in 1997. In 1998 he finished  second in NAMARS Midgets points with three feature event victories. He joined the USAC National Midget Tour in 1999 and was the Rookie of the Year. Fike finished a career-best second in USAC Midget points in 2001 with two victories at Lakeside Speedway in Kansas and at the Belleville Midget Nationals, also in Kansas. He finished runner-up in USAC Midget Copper World Classic at Phoenix in 2001. He also finished sixth in USAC Midget national points in 2002; posting a win at Limaland Motorsports Park in Ohio. His career-best Silver Crown finish was a third in the Copper World Classic at Phoenix International Raceway in 2002. Fike also posted three top-10 Silver Crown finishes in 5 starts in 2002. He finished 11th in USAC Sprint national points in 2002 with two runner-up finishes.

He was the Pork Pole winner at the Springfield mile-dirt track. Fike also qualified second at DuQuoin & Berlin. His best superspeedway qualifying effort was tenth at  Gateway. Fike led for 48 laps in two races. A veteran of USAC Sprint, Midget and Silver Crown Series competition, NAMARS, Badger and ARCA Midgets and go-karts.

After racing in NASCAR, he resumed racing in ARCA and Open Wheel. In 2009, he finished second in the USAC Silver Crown points.

NASCAR

Truck Series
Fike made two career starts in the Craftsman Truck Series. In 2003, Fike drove the #82 Ninetynine Racing Chevy at Phoenix. He started last in his debut, 36th in the field and finished 27th in the race, 6 laps off the pace. The next year, Fike would compete again for one race. He drove the #08 1-800-For-A-Phone Chevy at Bristol Motor Speedway for Green Light Racing. He once again started 36th and finished 33rd.

Busch Series
Fike began running the Busch Series part-time in 2005, splitting time with his brother Aaron in the No. 43 fielded by Curb Racing. He made his debut at the season opener at Daytona, starting 25th and finishing 30th. At Phoenix, A.J. made the field in 36th, but finished in 30th, one lap off the pace. He would race again at Nashville in June, securing his best career finish at that time of 28th. He was 32nd at Milwaukee Mile, 30th at Pikes Peak International Raceway and 33rd at IRP. A.J. started his last race of the season at Memphis Motorsports Park, finishing on the lead lap for the second time that season and finished 21st in his Liberty Village Dodge.

Motorsports career results

NASCAR
(key) (Bold – Pole position awarded by qualifying time. Italics – Pole position earned by points standings or practice time. * – Most laps led.)

Busch Series

Craftsman Truck Series

ARCA Racing Series
(key) (Bold – Pole position awarded by qualifying time. Italics – Pole position earned by points standings or practice time. * – Most laps led.)

References

External links
 
 

1980 births
Living people
NASCAR drivers
CARS Tour drivers
People from Galesburg, Illinois
Racing drivers from Illinois
USAC Silver Crown Series drivers